John E. Ferling (born 1940) is a professor emeritus of history at the University of West Georgia. As a leading historian in the American Revolution and founding era, he has appeared in television documentaries on PBS, the History Channel, C-SPAN Book TV, and the Learning Channel.

Biography
John Ferling was born in 1940 in Charleston, West Virginia. Ferling grew up in Texas City, Texas. Ferling attended Sam Houston State University, and later received a master's degree in history from Baylor University. He earned his Ph.D. in history from West Virginia University in 1971. John Ferling taught for 39 years, mostly at the University of West Georgia. Ferling retired from teaching to spend more time writing.

Awards
Lifetime Achievement Award
Fraunces Tavern Book Award
Outstanding Retired Faculty

Publications
 
The Ascent of George Washington: The Hidden Political Genius of an American Icon
Almost a Miracle: The American Victory in the War of Independence
The Loyalist Mind: Joseph Galloway and the American Revolution 
A Wilderness of Miseries: War and Warriors in Early America 
The First of Men: A Life of George Washington 
Struggle for a Continent: The Wars of Early America 
John Adams: A Life 
Setting the World Ablaze: Washington, Adams, Jefferson, and the American Revolution 
A Leap in the Dark: The Struggle to Create the American Republic 
Adams vs. Jefferson: The Tumultuous Election of 1800 
Independence: The Struggle to Set America Free (published June 21, 2011)
Jefferson and Hamilton: "The Rivalry That Forged A Nation"*

References

External links

In Depth interview with Ferling, July 5, 2009
Ferling discusses Almost a Miracle on September 27, 2007 at the Pritzker Military Museum & Library
Official website

21st-century American historians
American male non-fiction writers
Living people
University of West Georgia faculty
Historians of the American Revolution
1940 births
Baylor University alumni
Sam Houston State University alumni
West Virginia University alumni
21st-century American male writers